Missen-Wilhams is a municipality in the district of Oberallgäu in Bavaria.

Gallery

References

Oberallgäu